The 1956 NCAA basketball tournament involved 25 schools playing in single-elimination play to determine the national champion of men's NCAA college basketball. It began on March 12, 1956, and ended with the championship game on March 24 on Northwestern University's campus in Evanston, Illinois. A total of 29 games were played, including a third-place game in each region and a national third-place game.

The 1955–56 season was the last in which only one NCAA Tournament was held. Effective in 1956–57, the NCAA divided its membership into two competitive levels. The larger and more competitive athletic programs were placed in the University Division, and smaller programs in the College Division. Accordingly, that season would see separate tournaments contested in the University and College Divisions. In 1973, the University Division would be renamed NCAA Division I, while the College Division would be split into today's Divisions II and III.

This was the first NCAA tournament in which the four regionals were given distinct names, although the concept of four regional winners advancing to a single site for the "Final Four" had been introduced in 1952.

San Francisco, coached by Phil Woolpert, won the national title with an 83–71 victory in the final game over Iowa, coached by Bucky O'Connor. Hal Lear of Temple was named the tournament's Most Outstanding Player.

Locations

For the second time, the city of Evanston, Illinois hosted the Final Four. For the first time, a repeat host city used a different venue, this time using McGaw Memorial Hall, the second replacement for the original Patten Gym, home of the 1939 final.  The tournament saw two new venues, both in the state of Kansas, and both of which would join in rotation with Ahearn Field House as host of the Midwestern final for most of the next decade. In its first year of operation, Allen Field House on the campus of the University of Kansas hosted tournament games for the first time, acting as the West regional site. And also in the West region, the University of Wichita Field House, also in its first year of operation, hosted the first-round game. This tournament would also mark the final tournament to include the Allen County War Memorial Arena; neither the arena, which is still in operation, nor the city have hosted since.

Teams

Bracket
* – Denotes overtime period

East Region

Midwest Region

West Region

Far West Region

Final Four

See also
 1956 National Invitation Tournament
 1956 NAIA Basketball Tournament

Notes
 Canisius's first-round victory over the second-ranked North Carolina State Wolfpack, considered by many to be among the top ten upsets in tournament history, set a record for most overtime periods in a Division I Men's tournament game with four, a record that still stands as of 2015 (tied once, in 1961).
 Northwestern University previously hosted the first ever NCAA Men's Basketball Championship game on March 27, 1939, in the first Patten Gym.
 Alabama (21-3, 14-0) had won the Southeastern Conference and had their all-time highest ranking (#4) at the end of the 1956 season, but due to a rule that players could not play as freshman, as their entire starting lineup had previously done, they were ruled ineligible for the 1956 NCAA Tournament.
 There were six new participants in the 1956 tournament: Houston, Manhattan, Marshall, Michigan State, Morehead State and Wayne University (which became Wayne State University later that year). This was the only tournament for the Tartars (now Warriors), as they would drop to the College Division and eventually Division II. They are one of five teams to win a game in the tournament and drop from what is now Division I afterwards.

References

NCAA Division I men's basketball tournament
Ncaa
NCAA University Division basketball tournament
NCAA University Division basketball tournament